Florian Thorwart (born April 20, 1982 in Hagen) is a German retired football player who last played for FC Schalke 04 II.

Career
He made his professional debut in the Bundesliga for Borussia Dortmund on November 16, 2002 in a game against TSV 1860 München, when he came on as a substitute in the 90th minute.

References

1982 births
Living people
German footballers
Borussia Dortmund players
Borussia Dortmund II players
VfB Lübeck players
Rot-Weiss Essen players
FC Schalke 04 II players
SSVg Velbert players
Bundesliga players
2. Bundesliga players
Association football defenders
Sportspeople from Hagen
Footballers from North Rhine-Westphalia